The S Bridge is a historic stone arch bridge, spanning Salt Fork about  east of Old Washington, Ohio.  Built in 1828, it is one of the best-preserved surviving bridges built for the westward expansion of the National Road from Wheeling, West Virginia to Columbus, Ohio.  S bridges derive their name from the sharply curving approaches to the span.  The bridge was designated a National Historic Landmark in 1964.  The bridge is closed to traffic, and may be seen from Blend Road on the north and Rhinehart Road on the south.

Description and history
The S Bridge is located about four miles east of Old Washington, just north of the current alignments of Interstate 70 and County Road 690. The latter provides access to the roads leading to the bridge, Blend Road and Rhinehart Road. The road alignment it follows is historically that of the National Road, and later United States Route 40. There are large stone buttresses reinforcing each end of the arched section. The bridge's characteristic S shape is derived from the sharply curving approaches on either side of the main span.

The National Road was a project authorized by the United States Congress when it created the state of Ohio, in order to provide a reliable transport route across the Appalachian Mountains.  The road was completed to Wheeling in 1818, and Congress authorized an extension to Columbus in 1825.  This bridge was built as part of that expansion project, and was the major route by which Ohio and the Old Northwest were settled.  This is one of four surviving S bridges built in Ohio for the National Road.

See also
National Historic Landmarks in Ohio
List of bridges on the National Register of Historic Places in Ohio

References

External links

 at the National Park Service's NRHP database

Bridges completed in 1828
National Historic Landmarks in Ohio
National Road
Road bridges on the National Register of Historic Places in Ohio
Transportation in Guernsey County, Ohio
National Register of Historic Places in Guernsey County, Ohio
Buildings and structures in Guernsey County, Ohio
Stone arch bridges in the United States